China's Wild West is a 2009 British documentary directed by Urszula Pontikos.

The film received its world premiere at the 2009 Sundance Film Festival, its European premiere at the 2009 One World Film Festival. It won Prix du Jeune Public at the 2009 Anûû-rû âboro International Film Festival in New Caledonia. The film has subsequently screened at many human rights, documentary and ethnographic international film festivals including Full Frame Documentary Film Festival, True/False Film Festival and Silverdocs.

Reception
"A moving comment on human aspiration and a devastating portrait of futility" Washington City Paper

"Hypnotic... stunning" IonCinema.com/SilverDocs

"Visually compelling" One World International Human Rights Film Festival

"Austerely beautiful" True/False International Film Festival

"Mesmerizing" Full Frame International Film Festival

"Masterful photography" Cinemambiente Film Festival

External links
China's Wild West at the Internet Movie Database
 Official Website
 Review
 Sundance Film Festival

2009 films
2009 documentary films
Sterling Pictures films
British documentary films
2000s British films
Uyghur-language films